The Taungurung people, also spelt Daung Wurrung, are an Aboriginal people who are one of the Kulin nations in present-day Victoria, Australia. They consist of nine clans whose traditional language is the Taungurung language.

Their Country is to the north of the Great Dividing Range in the watersheds of the Broken, Delatite, Coliban, Goulburn and Campaspe Rivers. They lived to the north of, and were closely associated with, the Woiwurrung speaking Wurundjeri people.

They were also known by white settlers as the Devil's River Tribe or Goulburn River Tribe.

Clan structure
The Taungurung have two moieties (kinship groups) covering nine distinct clans, each of which belonged to the Bunjil (Eaglehawk) moiety (five clans) or the Waang (Crow) moiety (four clans).

Bunjil moiety
 Buthera balug, located in the Upper Goulburn area near Yea and Seymour.
 Moomoom Gundidj, around the Campaspe and north-west of Mitchellstown
 Warring-illum balug around the Upper Goulburn River, Yea and Alexandra.
 Yarran Illam, in the area of the Goulburn river below Seymour.
 Yeerun-Illam around Benalla.

Waang moiety
 Look (w)illam around the Campaspe River near Kilmore
 Nattarak balug associated with the Coliban and Upper Campaspe Rivers.
 Nira balug adjacent to Wurundjeri country, encompassing hilly terrain near Kilmore, Broadford, Pyalong, Mount Macedon and Heathcote.
 Yowung-Illam balug, associated with Alexandra, Mansfield and the Upper Goulburn River.

History
The Taungurung people used the King and Howqua River valleys as a major route for trade or war between tribes. The Howqua River valley contains a number of archaeological sites of significance including at least two quarry sites for greenstone, an exceptionally hard rock used for stone axes, spears and other cutting tools which the Taungurung traded with other tribes.
There are many other significant cultural both tangible and in tangible across their country.

A raiding party of up to 40 Taungurung is believed to have been killed in May–June 1839 on Dja Dja Wurrung territory at the Campaspe Plains massacre.

In February 1859 some Wurundjeri elders, led by Simon Wonga (aged 35) and brother Tommy Munnering (aged 24) petitioned Protector William Thomas to secure land on behalf of the Taungurung clans for the Kulin at the junction of the Acheron and Goulburn rivers in Taungurung territory. Initial representations to the Victorian Government were positive, however the intervention of the most powerful squatter in Victoria, Hugh Glass, resulted in their removal to a colder site, Mohican Station, which was not suitable for agricultural land and had to be abandoned.

In March 1863 after three years of upheaval, the surviving leaders, among them Simon Wonga and William Barak, led forty Wurundjeri, Taungurung (Goulburn River) and Boonwurrung people over the Black Spur and squatted on a traditional camping site on Badger Creek near Healesville and requested ownership of the site. This became Coranderrk Station.

The Taungurung Clans Aboriginal Corporation was registered as a Registered Aboriginal Party by the Victorian Aboriginal Heritage Council on 16 July 2009.

Notes

Citations

Sources

External links 
 Taungurung Clans Aboriginal Corporation website
 Bibliography of Taungurong people and language resources, at the Australian Institute of Aboriginal and Torres Strait Islander Studies

Aboriginal peoples of Victoria (Australia)
History of Victoria (Australia)
Kulin nation